This is a list of the main career statistics of Czech professional tennis player Tomáš Berdych.

Significant finals

Grand Slam finals

Singles: 1 (1 runner-up)

Masters 1000 finals

Singles: 4 (1 title, 3 runners-up)

ATP career finals

Singles: 32 (13 titles, 19 runner-ups)

Doubles: 3 (2 titles, 1 runner-up)

Team competition finals: 6 (3 titles, 3 runners-up)

Performance timelines

Davis Cup matches are included in the statistics. Walkovers or qualifying matches are neither official wins nor losses.

Singles 

Notes: 

1Berdych withdrew before the semifinals of the 2014 Miami Masters.

2Berdych received a second round walkover at the 2016 Miami Masters.

Doubles

Best Grand Slam results details

Record against top 10 players

* Statistics correct as of August 2019.

Top 10 wins
He has a 53–124 (.299) record against players who were, at the time the match was played, ranked in the top 10.

Career Grand Slam tournament seedings

Tennis career statistics